is a railway station operated by JR West on the Gantoku Line in Iwakuni, Yamaguchi. It is located in a rural area of Iwakuni, southwest of the city center.

History

December 1, 1934: Station opens
April 1, 1987: Station operation is taken over by JR West after privatization of Japanese National Railways

Layout
The station has two tracks, with one island platform situated between the two. Access from the station building is by a walkway crossing one of the tracks.

Platforms

Adjacent stations
West Japan Railway (JR West)

See also
 List of railway stations in Japan

External links

  

Railway stations in Japan opened in 1934
Railway stations in Yamaguchi Prefecture